Martín Amuz (born 21 April 1997) is a Uruguayan professional footballer who plays as a centre-back for Uruguayan Primera División club C.S.D. Villa Española.

Club career

Danubio
Amuz joined the academy of Danubio in 2010. He made his professional debut on 6 March 2016, in a 0–2 loss to Fénix.

Villa Española
In April 2021, Amuz joined Villa Española of the Uruguayan Primera División. He made his debut with the club on 29 May 2021 against Plaza Colonia.

International career
Born in Canada and raised in Uruguay, Amuz is of Uruguayan descent. He represented Uruguay at under-18 level.

References

1997 births
Living people
People with acquired Uruguayan citizenship
Uruguayan footballers
Association football central defenders
Danubio F.C. players
Uruguay youth international footballers
Soccer players from Toronto
Canadian soccer players
Canadian people of Uruguayan descent
Sportspeople of Uruguayan descent